Serge Dumont (born February 1960), is a French businessman and one of the pioneers in China’s corporate and marketing communications industry. From 2006 to 2018, he served as Omnicom Group Vice Chairman and Chairman, Asia Pacific, and ran Omnicom's Greater China business unit.

Career and early life
A French citizen born in Tunisia, Dumont graduated from the Sorbonne University in Paris. He holds dual degrees in sociology and oriental languages and civilizations, and has studied at the Taiwan Normal University] and the Political Institute in Taipei.

In 1985 he moved to Hong Kong and Beijing and established China’s first joint venture communications and government relations consultancy, Interasia. The company acquired a roster of Fortune 500 clients and became a market leader. In 1993 Dumont sold Interasia to the world's largest PR group, Edelman. He was appointed Executive Vice President of the Edelman Group, President of Asia and sat on the Global Board.

From 1998 to 2006, Dumont concentrated on PE activities, as well as strategic advisory and philanthropic work. In 2006 he joined Omnicom Group and in 2011 was appointed Vice Chairman of the Omnicom Group and Chairman Asia Pacific. One of his key responsibilities was directly managing the fast-growing Greater China business unit by developing business strategies for all Omnicom activities and building relationships that expanded the group’s operational footprint globally. He reported to John Wren, the Chairman and CEO of Omnicom Group. In 2018, he left Omnicom to focus on philanthropic and investment activities.

Advisory work and philanthropic activities
Dumont has been involved in philanthropic and government advisory work in the areas of education and public health. In 2006 he was named a Special Representative  for UNAIDS, the joint United Nations Program on HIV/AIDS. He led a team of experts who advised the Beijing Municipal Government and the World Health Organization during the SARS crisis of 2003.

In 2004, with the Tsinghua University School of Journalism and Communications, he founded the first scholarship fund aimed at developing qualified professionals for the marketing communications industry. He has also set up partnership programs with Fudan University and the China European International Business School (CEIBS).

Since 2003, he has served as Conseiller du Commerce Extérieur de la France (France’s Foreign Trade Advisor).

He currently sits on several boards including the Advisory Board of the Tsinghua University School of Journalism and Communications, and the boards of Synergos  and recently stepped down from the Corporate Advisory Board of CEIBS and the board of trustees of the China Youth Development Foundation on which he served for many years. Since 2013, he has been a jury member and in 2015 became a nominating committee member of the Prince’s Prize for Innovative Philanthropy, a global initiative of the Prince Albert II of Monaco Foundation and the Paris-based Tocqueville Foundation. In 2019 he was invited to serve on the jury of the David Rockefeller Bridging Leadership award 2020.

Publications 
In 2003, Dumont co-authored, the first book to analyze the brand strategies of the top Chinese companies who were expanding internationally.

Honors and awards

His contribution to society has been recognised through honors and awards from a number of national governments and international organizations.  In 2008 he received a Gold Medal from UNAIDS for
"outstanding contributions to the AIDS response". In 2011 he received the Holmes Report’s Asia-Pacific Lifetime Achievement Sabre Award for Outstanding Individual Achievement. In 2014 he was honored by the China Advertising Association for Outstanding contribution to the advertising Industry. In 2015, Serge Dumont was named by Debrett's among the top 100 most influential people in Hong Kong. In 2016, on the occasion of the APAC Cristal Awards, an Outstanding Merit Award was given to Serge Dumont.

Other honors and awards include the following:

Légion d’Honneur (Legion of Honor)
Chevalier des Palmes Académiques (Knight in the Order of Academic Palms)
Officier des Arts et Lettres (Officer of Arts and Letters)
Chevalier du Mérite Agricole (Knight, National Order of Agricultural Merit)
: Grand Officer, Stella della Solidarieta Italiana (Grand Officer of the Star of Italian Solidarity).
: Officer of the Ouissam Alaouite (Royal Order of Al-Alaoui, Kingdom of Morocco)
: Officer of the Order of the Crown of Belgium

Notes

References
 Serge Dumont Personal Site
 Serge Dumont Fund Website

1960 births
French advertising executives
Living people